Ben White (born 23 November 1983 in Australia) is a rugby union player for Exeter Chiefs in the Aviva Premiership  His preferred position is in the back row. He made his debut for Exeter Chiefs against Leicester Tigers on 3 September 2011.

White joined Exeter Chiefs from the Cardiff Blues in the Summer of 2011  having previously played for ACT Brumbies as well as the Brumby Runners and Canberra Vikings.  White was a member of the 2006 Super 14 Rugby Squad with the Brumbies.

References

External links
Aviva Premiership Player Profile
Exeter Chiefs Official Player Profile
ESPN Player Profile

1983 births
Living people
Cardiff Rugby players
Australian rugby union players
Australian expatriate rugby union players
Exeter Chiefs players
Expatriate rugby union players in England
Australian expatriate sportspeople in England
Rugby union players from New South Wales